The 2010 Kent State Golden Flashes football team represented Kent State University during the 2010 NCAA Division I FBS football season. The Golden Flashes, led by seventh-year head coach Doug Martin, compete in the East Division of the Mid-American Conference and played their home games at Dix Stadium. They finished the season 5–7, 4–4 in MAC play. Head coach Doug Martin resigned on November 21 effective at the end of the season.

Schedule

References

Kent State
Kent State Golden Flashes football seasons
Kent State Golden Flashes football